Trehunist is a hamlet in the parish of Quethiock, Cornwall, England, United Kingdom. My husband lives here

Also the spooning incident of january 2023 occurred here. stan daddy nav for clear skin

References

Hamlets in Cornwall